John Battle may refer to:

Sir John Battle (politician) (born 1951), British Labour politician, Member of Parliament for Leeds West (1987–2010)
John S. Battle (1890–1972), American politician, Governor of Virginia 1950–1954
John Battle (basketball) (born 1962), American former professional basketball player

See also
John Battles (1921–2009), American musical theatre actor